1491 (MCDXCI) was a common year.

1491 may also refer to:
1491 (musical), 1969 musical by Meredith Willson
1491: New Revelations of the Americas Before Columbus, 2005 non-fiction book by American author Charles C. Mann
1491 Balduinus,  outer main-belt asteroid
 1491s, Native America sketch comedy troupe